Pine Acres is an unincorporated community in Amador County, California. It lies at an elevation of 2684 feet (818 m).

References

External links

Unincorporated communities in California
Unincorporated communities in Amador County, California